These are the Australian Country number-one albums of 2016, per the ARIA Charts.

See also
2016 in music
List of number-one albums of 2016 (Australia)

References

2016
Australia country albums
Number-one country albums